SSFL may refer to:

 Santa Susana Field Laboratory, a nuclear and aerospace research facility in Simi Valley, California
 Southern States Football League, a semi-pro American football league based in Florida
 Southern Sydney Freight Line, a railway line under construction in Sydney, Australia
 South of Scotland Football League, an amateur soccer league in Scotland
 Staffordshire Senior Football League, a defunct English football league
 Super Sunday Football League, a semi-pro / amateur soccer league in South Korea